Veselin Vuković (born 19 December 1958) is a Serbian handball coach and former player who competed for Yugoslavia in the 1984 Summer Olympics.

Club career
Born in Struga (PR Macedonia), Vuković moved with his family to Šabac (PR Serbia) at an early age. He started out at local club Metaloplastika, helping them win six Yugoslav Championships (1981–82, 1982–83, 1983–84, 1984–85, and 1985–86), four Yugoslav Cups (1979–80, 1982–83, 1983–84, and 1985–86), and two successive European Cups (1984–85 and 1985–86). In 1986, Vuković went abroad to Spain and spent four seasons with Atlético Madrid. He also briefly played for Helados Alacant, before joining European champions Barcelona in 1991.

International career
At international level, Vuković represented Yugoslavia at the 1984 Summer Olympics in Los Angeles, winning the gold medal. He was also a regular member of the team that won the 1986 World Championship in Switzerland.

Coaching career
Vuković served as an assistant to FR Yugoslavia head coach Veselin Vujović at the 2000 Summer Olympics. He performed the same role for two years while Vujović was head coach of Serbia and Montenegro.

On 1 April 2010, Vuković was appointed as head coach for Serbia. He led them to the final of the 2012 European Championship, which they lost to Denmark.

Honours

Player
Metaloplastika
 Yugoslav Handball Championship: 1981–82, 1982–83, 1983–84, 1984–85, 1985–86
 Yugoslav Handball Cup: 1979–80, 1982–83, 1983–84, 1985–86
 European Cup: 1984–85, 1985–86
Atlético Madrid
 Copa del Rey: 1986–87
Barcelona
 Liga ASOBAL: 1991–92
 Copa del Rey: 1992–93

Coach
Metaloplastika
 Serbian Handball Cup: 2015–16

References

External links

 Olympic record
 

1958 births
Living people
Sportspeople from Struga
Serbs of North Macedonia
Serbian male handball players
Yugoslav male handball players
Olympic handball players of Yugoslavia
Olympic gold medalists for Yugoslavia
Handball players at the 1984 Summer Olympics
Olympic medalists in handball
Medalists at the 1984 Summer Olympics
Competitors at the 1983 Mediterranean Games
Mediterranean Games gold medalists for Yugoslavia
Mediterranean Games medalists in handball
RK Metaloplastika players
FC Barcelona Handbol players
Liga ASOBAL players
Expatriate handball players
Yugoslav expatriate sportspeople in Spain
Serbian handball coaches
Serbian expatriate sportspeople in Cyprus